Samuel Pisar (March 18, 1929 – July 27, 2015) was a Polish-American lawyer, author, and a Holocaust survivor.

Early life
Pisar was born in Białystok, Poland, to Jewish parents David and Helaina (née Suchowolska) Pisar. His father established the region's first taxi service.

His parents and younger sister Frieda were murdered in the Holocaust. Pisar was sent to Majdanek, Bliżyn, Auschwitz, Sachsenhausen, Oranienburg, Dachau and ultimately to the Engelberg Tunnel near Leonberg. At the end of the war, he escaped during a death march; after making a break into the forest, he found refuge in a US tank. He is the only Holocaust survivor of the 900 children of his Polish school.

After the liberation, Pisar spent a year and a half in the American occupation zone of Germany, engaging in black marketeering with fellow survivors. He was rescued by an aunt living in Paris. An uncle sent him to Melbourne, Australia, where he resumed his studies.

He attended George Taylor and Staff School (now Taylors College) and went on to attain a Bachelor of Laws from the University of Melbourne in 1953. After recovering from a bout of tuberculosis, he traveled to the United States and earned a juris doctor from Harvard University. He also held a doctorate from the Sorbonne.

Career

Legal career
In 1950, Pisar worked for the United Nations in New York and Paris. He returned to Washington in 1960 to become a member of John F. Kennedy's economic and foreign policy task force. He was also an advisor to the State Department, the Senate and House committees.

As a lawyer, Pisar's clients included many Fortune 500 companies and many known business leaders of the 20th and 21st century. His books have been translated into many languages. Pisar was the longtime lawyer and confidant of Robert Maxwell. Pisar was possibly the last person to speak to Maxwell before he apparently fell to his death from his luxury yacht in November 1991.

Literary career
Pisar's memoir, Of Blood and Hope, in which he tells the story of how he survived the Holocaust, received the Present Tense literary award in 1981. He wrote a narration based on his experiences and his anger at God, for Leonard Bernstein's Symphony No. 3 ("Kaddish"). He stated that the idea came from Bernstein, who felt Pisar could bring a more authentic voice to the symphony than he could, not having gone through the Holocaust himself.

After Bernstein's death and the attacks on the World Trade Center, Pisar wrote Dialogue with God, in which he expressed his concern for the future of mankind. In June 2009, the poem was recited by Pisar at a performance of Kaddish at Yad Vashem in Jerusalem, Israel.

Other activities
Pisar co-founded Yad Vashem-France, was a Director of the Foundation pour la Mémoire de la Shoah, and a Trustee of the Brookings Institution Washington.

Private life and honors
Pisar married twice. He had two daughters by his first wife, Norma Pisar, and one, Leah Pisar (who worked in the White House for Bill Clinton), from his second wife, Judith, with whom he lived in Paris and New York City. His stepson, Judith's son, Antony Blinken was appointed to President Joe Biden's cabinet as Secretary of State.

Among distinctions, he was a Grand Officer of the French Legion of Honour by then President Nicolas Sarkozy in 2012 and a Commander of the Order of Merit of the Republic of Poland. In March 1995, Pisar was appointed an Honorary Officer of the Order of Australia by Queen Elizabeth, "for service to international relations and human rights".

Death
Pisar died from pneumonia on July 27, 2015 in Manhattan, age 86.

References

External links

Harvard Law Bulletin Profile

1929 births
2015 deaths
American people of Polish-Jewish descent
Harvard Law School alumni
People from Białystok
People with acquired American citizenship
Honorary Officers of the Order of Australia
Majdanek concentration camp survivors
Auschwitz concentration camp survivors
Dachau concentration camp survivors
Sachsenhausen concentration camp survivors
Białystok Ghetto inmates
Officiers of the Ordre des Arts et des Lettres
Grand Officiers of the Légion d'honneur
Commanders of the Order of Merit of the Republic of Poland
Deaths from pneumonia in New York City
Articles containing video clips
Blinken family